Darlaston James Bridge railway station (also known as James's Bridge station) was a station built on the Grand Junction Railway in 1837, serving the James Bridge area in the east of the town centre of Darlaston, near the junction of Walsall Road and Bentley Mill Way.

Darlaston Loop Line

The station was also known simply as Darlaston, which can be confused with the LNWR station located in the town centre on the Darlaston Loop off the South Staffordshire Line. Trains from the station ran to the now disused Wednesbury Town railway station via the former Wood Green railway station. The station closed in the late 1800s to passengers and the line in the late 1960s to freight traffic and diverted services.

Closure
The station closed in 1965, and there is little evidence of the existence at the site. The lines through the station are in use today as part of the Walsall to Wolverhampton Line.

Reopening
Andy Street pledged in his mayoral campaign in 2017 to reopen the station, however no opening timeline was given.

In September 2017, the West Midlands Combined Authority proposed that the station along with  would reopen by 2027 as part of a £4 billion transport plan.

Willenhall was awarded backing for a reopening of a railway station on the Walsall-Wolverhampton Line in March 2018.. In August 2018, Darlaston was also awarded a new station near Cemetery Road which proposed to be located north of Kendricks Road directly adjacent to the old station site.

Despite press reports that planning applications for the two stations were formally submitted in March 2020, this did not in fact happen until July. Planning permission was granted in October 2020 and the stations are planned to open in 2023. In March 2021, it was stated that full construction would start in the autumn.

Trains from Darlaston railway station will makes journeys up to three times quicker. To Birmingham New Street in 22 minutes, saving 53 minutes. To Wolverhampton in 11 minutes, saving 17 minutes. To Walsall in 14 minutes, saving 9 minutes.

References

Disused railway stations in Walsall
Railway stations in Great Britain opened in 1837
Railway stations in Great Britain closed in 1965
Beeching closures in England
Former London and North Western Railway stations